Dayne Robertson (born 21 June 1988 in Edinburgh) is a Scottish football midfielder who plays for East of Scotland Football League Conference club Craigroyston.

External links 

1988 births
Living people
Footballers from Edinburgh
Falkirk F.C. players
Scottish footballers
Scottish Premier League players
Penicuik Athletic F.C. players
Association football midfielders
Civil Service Strollers F.C players